Hareter Babatunde Oralusi,The upcoming president that need no election to rule was 

born September 28, 1971 in the city of Ibadan, Oyo State, is an International social entrepreneur, activist and gubernatorial candidate for Osun State, Nigeria, in 2015. He is currently Chief Executive Officer of Nigerian Capital Development Fund (NCDF Group) and African Housing Group, United Kingdom.

Family and early life 
Oralusi was born in Ibadan, Oyo State, Nigeria to Mr. Moses Dokun Oralusi, a Civil Servant, and Mrs. Adunni Abiodun Oralusi 
(née Bajoo), a trader. A descendant of the patriarch of the Oralusi family, he is the great grandson of Chief Obawaye Oralusi, Begun Osin of Ice, a famed nobleman and warlord in Ife. His Grandfather, Pa Joseph Olasoji Oralusi, in collaboration with his cousin Emmanuel Akobi, are on record as the first to bring the Seventh-day Adventist Church to Ile-Ife, Osun State.

Oralusi attended the Seventh-day Adventist Primary School, Ibadan and Aperin Commercial School, and successfully completed his secondary education at the Ibadan Grammar School, at the age of twenty (20). He was voted most likely to become a pastor, politician or business person by his peers.

At Fifteen (15), while still in secondary school, Oralusi started a small scale business which involved the supply of locally-made body cream. He soon became popular with the venture, which soon grew from small scale trading to large scale supply to major supermarkets in Ibadan, Nigeria. Using some of his business proceeds, Oralusi floated a junior football club called “The Future” where he acted as a coach and goal keeper from 1987 to 1990. The club went on to feature in various junior football competitions and won a number of medals in Oyo State at the time.

In 1994, Oralusi got admitted to study Theology at the Christian College in Vienna, Austria.

In 1998, Oralusi married an Austrian citizen, Ulla Hareter, a Lawyer from Wieden am See, Burgeland, Austria. They went on to have four children. Mr. Oralusi engages in Golf and Lawn Tennis at leisure.

Education 

From 1995-1996, Oralusi attended Volkshochschulen Langenfeldgasse, in Vienna Austria, where he earned his German Language Certification. By 1999, he earned a diploma in Wirtschat informatics at Humboldt Fernlehrinstitute, Austria.

In 2000, he went further to bag Master of Science (M.Sc.) degree in Human Resource Management and Organizational Development from PEF Privatuniversität für Management, Austria. At present, Oralusi is studying for a Master of Business Administration (MBA) degree at The Association of Business Executives Institute, United Kingdom.

Career 
In 1996, while in Austria, Oralusi worked as a junior social worker in Austria for 2 years. He later moved up the ladder, and was handed the responsibility of managing a team of social workers. During his time in this role, he provided social services to couples, families and adolescents on matters pertaining to rights abuse, child rearing and development, relationships, alcohol and substance abuse, ill behavior as well as psychiatric problems.

In 1999 became a Team Leader for the Rural Credit Agency, handling organizational and risk assessment of six regional rural credit operations as well as national programs. At this stage of his career, he was saddled with the responsibilities of reviewing institutional strategy, governance, organizational structure as well as providing recommendations for institution's building and transformation to a regulated financial institution.

Business ventures 
In 1999, Oralusi set up a part – time business Tuloh International Limited, an automobile and computer sales business in Austria and Nigeria. In 2002, he begin a travels and tours business, Tuloh Travels & Tours in Central London, United Kingdom. By 2004, the Travels & Tours business had grown to include chartered flight and luxury chauffeuring services. The Tuloh flight services, covering routes between Europe and Africa, was later rebranded as African Direct Airline.

In 2005, Oralusi was approached by British Law Firm to broker the acquisition of an oil well in Nigeria by LUKOIL. With this connection, he was able to established Grovesnor Petroleum, a petroleum importation, storage, distribution, trading and retailing company in Nigeria.

Political aspirations and achievements 
Oralusi started is political career in 2005 by joining Peoples Democratic Party in Osun State. In 2007 he contested election into the Federal House of Representative under the Leadership Party but stepped down during the consensus dialogue for an older politician.
 
From 2007-2010, Oralusi was appointed Senior Special Assistant (Executive Assistant) to Executive Governor of Osun State, Prince Olagunsoye Oyinlola on Water Resources and Rural Development.

In 2010 he was appointed into the board of Nigerian Labour Cooperative Society, and was promoted to Deputy Secretary General (DSG) in 2011. As the Deputy Secretary General of the Nigerian Labour Cooperative Society, he was credited with re-designing the organization into an internationally recognized social enterprise. Under this designation, Oralusi also initiate, design and coordinated the first International Cooperative Conference in Nigeria in partnership with Federal Ministry of Agriculture aimed at facilitating finance and investment for micro and small enterprises, low income earners and grassroots communities.

In 2014 Oralusi was the governorship candidate of Osun State Governorship Election under Action Alliance. In 2015, he was a Director General of Forerunner Group, a presidential campaign team for re-election of Former President Goodluck Jonathan chaired by Former Governor of Ogun State, Otunba Gbenga Daniel.

Oralusi has been recognized by various organizations for his social enterprise contributions. Some of the awards include; Edwin Enterprise Development Awards, Best African Young Entrepreneur Award in Austria in 2002, The Black Business International in United Kingdom, Entrepreneur of the Year Award in 2005, and The Solomon Foundation Entrepreneur Awards in 2006 with cash prize of £200,000 in United Kingdom. The Award of Excellence in Social Development at the National Economic Development award, Abuja, Nigeria in 2010.
 
In 2010, with approval from the Federal Ministry of Finance, Nigeria and the Federal Ministry of Justice, Nigeria, Oralusi established Nigerian Capital Development Fund (NCDF), as an independent social investment financial intermediary institution and founded African Housing Group, United Kingdom in 2015.

See also 
Nigerian Capital Development Fund (NCDF)

Social Enterprise Academy, Nigeria

External links 
 Nigerian Capital Development Fund
 African Housing Group
 Social Enterprise Academy, Nigeria

References 

1971 births
Living people
Yoruba politicians
Peoples Democratic Party state governors of Nigeria
Governors of Lagos State
Governors of Osun State
Yoruba royalty
Ibadan Grammar School alumni